Jon Alvie Gutierrez, professionally known as King Badger, is a Filipino rapper, actor and member of the Filipino hip hop collective Ex Battalion.

Personal life and career 
Gutierrez's father is British, and his mother is of Filipino origin. Gutierrez is a member of the Filipino hip hop collective Ex Battalion who is also known as King Badger since 2016, who performed in some television programs of GMA Network. On 6 October 2018, Gutierrez finally married his longtime girlfriend Jelai Andres.

In 2019, Gutierrez was accused of marital infidelity by his wife, social media influencer and actress Jelai Andres, who claimed that he cheated on her with Toni Fowler.

In 2021, Gutierrez was involved again in a similar issue Andres filed a concubinage complaint against Gutierrez in the Department of Justice, in Quezon City, on 1 June 2021.

On 10 May 2021, Gutierrez released a track entitled 'SRRY' with an accompanying music video under the Ex Battalion YouTube channel. The piece depicts his regrets about his previous relationship with Jelai Andres.

Discography

Singles

Filmography

Television

References

External links 
 

Living people
Filipino rappers
Universal Records (Philippines) artists
21st-century Filipino male singers
Filipino male television actors
Year of birth missing (living people)
Ex Battalion members
GMA Network personalities